Nirbhay Wadhwa is an Indian film and television actor. He had appeared in Star Plus' Mahabharat, where he played the negative role of Dushasana. He also played Hanuman in Sankatmochan Mahabali Hanuman and the role of Kaalasur in Qayamat Ki Raat.

Early life
Nirbhay Wadhwa is from Jaipur. He is the older brother of actor Gaurav Wadhwa. Nirbhay spent his childhood in Bikaner, Rajasthan. He did his schooling from St. Edmund's School, Jaipur. He later earned Bachelor's Degree in Arts from Rajasthan University. Nirbhay was always passionate to make his career in the field of entertainment and he did a lot of hard work so far to achieve his position. Nirbhay is also a pet lover and social worker and associate with the " Help in Suffering" NGO in Jaipur.

Career
Wadhwa had appeared in Star Plus television's mythological drama Mahabharat, where he played the negative role of Dushasana. Wadhwa made his Bollywood debut as cameo in 2014 Hindi film Main Aur Mr. Riight, where he played the role of a struggling actor. He also played the role of Hakim Khan Sur in Sony TV's historical drama Bharat Ka Veer Putra – Maharana Pratap.
Currently he is playing the lead antagonist in Qayamat Ki Raat on Star Plus. Nirbhay also played the role of Pehlwan Durjan in Tenali Rama. He played the role of Mahishasur in the show Vighnaharta Ganesha and also played the role of Hanuman in Sankatmochan Mahabali Hanuman which were telecasted on Sony Entertainment Television. He again got the role of Hanuman in Shani (TV series). On Colors in Mahakali — Anth Hi Aarambh Hai, he played the role of Mahishasur.

Personal life
On 28 June 2011, Nirbhay married Preeti Wadhwa. They have a daughter born in 2015.

Television

References

External links
 
 

21st-century Indian male actors
Living people
Indian male television actors
Indian male film actors
Male actors in Hindi television
Indian male models
Male actors from Rajasthan
Male actors from Jaipur
Year of birth missing (living people)